Beheshti may refer to:

People
Mohammad Beheshti, one of the main architects of Iranian Islamic Revolution and the constitution of the Islamic Republic in Iran who was assassinated in 1981
Sattar Beheshti, Iranian blogger who died in police custody in November 2012

Places
Beheshti, Kerman